Ford Field is a domed American football stadium located in Downtown Detroit. It primarily serves as the home of the Detroit Lions of the National Football League (NFL), as well as the Mid-American Conference championship game and the annual Quick Lane Bowl college football bowl game, state championship football games for the MHSAA, the MHSAA State Wrestling Championships, and the MCBA Marching Band State Finals, among other events. The regular seating capacity is approximately 65,000, though it is expandable up to 70,000 for football and 80,000 for basketball.

The naming rights were purchased by the Ford Motor Company for $40 million over 20 years; the Ford family holds a controlling interest in the company, and they have controlled ownership of the Lions franchise since 1963.

History

Planning and construction
In 1975, the Lions moved to the Pontiac Silverdome after playing at Tiger Stadium from 1938 to 1939 and 1941 to 1974. By the mid 1990s, they began exploring the possibility of returning to the city of Detroit in order to build a new stadium. On August 20, 1996, the Lions announced their intention to build a new stadium in Downtown Detroit. On November 5, 1996, voters approved a referendum for the stadium.

Groundbreaking for the stadium occurred on November 16, 1999, as part of a downtown revitalization plan for the city of Detroit, which included Comerica Park.

Design
The stadium's design incorporates a former Hudson's warehouse, which was constructed in the 1920s. The warehouse was converted to office space and currently has Campbell Ewald and Bodman as tenants.

The presence of the warehouse allows for a seating arrangement that is unique among professional American football stadiums. The majority of suites are located in the warehouse along the stadium's southern sideline, as are the lounges that serve the premium club seats on that side of the field. The bulk of the grandstand seats are located along the northern sideline and both end-lines, with gaps in the stadium's upper half at the southwest and southeast corners. The upper deck on the stadium's northern sideline also contains one level of suites and a smaller section of club seating. A similar design was implemented at the renovated Soldier Field, albeit with the use of a new structure (as opposed to an existing building) to house four levels of suites.

Unlike most prior domed stadiums, Ford Field allows a large amount of natural light to reach the field, thanks to immense skylights and large glass windows at the open corners. The windows along the ceiling are frosted to mimic the automotive factories that are prevalent in Metro Detroit. The south entrance provides the seating bowl and concourse with sunlight year-round and also offers fans a view of downtown Detroit.

Ford Field is one of the few venues in the NFL that has end zones in the east and the west. There is no NFL rule for field construction in roofed venues regarding sunlight distracting players on the field. The east–west end zone design accommodated the Hudson warehouse location. The natural light is not a distraction to the players in a day game, because the light only reaches as far as the sidelines, leaving the field still properly lit with the combination of artificial stadium lighting and sunlight.

In 2017, Ford Field underwent its first major renovation. The $100 million renovation included new video boards, a new sound system, updated suites, and the renovation of multiple restaurants, clubs, and bars on the property.

Major events

Football
Ford Field hosted Super Bowl XL on February 5, 2006, as the Pittsburgh Steelers defeated the Seattle Seahawks, 21–10 to win their fifth Super Bowl championship in front of 68,206 in attendance. It also marked the final game in the 13-year career for Steelers running back, and Detroit native, Jerome Bettis.

The stadium was home to the Little Caesars Pizza Bowl sponsored by Detroit-based Little Caesars (previously known as the Motor City Bowl and jointly sponsored by the Big Three automakers headquartered in Detroit – Chrysler, Ford, and General Motors) from 2002 until 2013. It featured a top Mid-American Conference team and a Big Ten Conference team. The Little Caesars Pizza Bowl was replaced by the Quick Lane Bowl, featuring teams from the Big Ten Conference and Atlantic Coast Conference, and backed by the Lions and Ford. It has also hosted the annual MAC Football Championship Game since 2004.

Ford Field has been the site of several neutral site regular season college football games, including Western Michigan vs. Illinois in 2008 and Michigan State vs. Florida Atlantic in 2010. Central Michigan was set to play Western Michigan at Ford Field on October 17, 2020. However, on August 8, 2020, the  Mid-American Conference announced that all fall sports were cancelled due to the COVID-19 pandemic.

On December 13, 2010, the Minnesota Vikings played a home game at Ford Field against the New York Giants after the Hubert H. Humphrey Metrodome's inflatable roof collapsed due to a rip in the roofing material caused by heavy snow accumulation. The roof failure forced the already postponed game to be moved elsewhere, and after deliberations, the NFL chose Ford Field. It was the first ever regular season Monday night game played at Ford Field, and one of the few instances where a team played an unofficial home game at another (rival) team's home field. The Lions hosted their first ever Monday Night Football game in Ford Field on October 10, 2011, against the Chicago Bears.

A Buffalo Bills home game against the New York Jets was played at Ford Field on November 24, 2014, after a major lake effect snowstorm hit western New York, causing the game to be moved from Ralph Wilson Stadium. The Bills won the game 38–3. A similar scenario also took place on November 20, 2022 when the Bills' home game against the Cleveland Browns was also moved to Ford Field. The Bills won the game 31–23.

Basketball

On December 13, 2003, Ford Field hosted the then largest crowd ever to attend a basketball game, as 78,129 people packed the stadium for the Basketbowl, where the Kentucky Wildcats defeated the Michigan State Spartans, 79–74.

The University of Detroit Mercy and Ford Field hosted the 2008 NCAA basketball tournament regional semifinal and final games (March 28 and 30). Ford Field was the site of the 2009 Final Four (April 4 and 6). For the 2008 NCAA basketball tournament, the court was placed in the center of the football field rather than in an end of the stadium. This was the first time this configuration was used for NCAA Tournament play with the new 70,000-seat capacity rule in effect.

Ford Field will be the site of the 2027 Final Four.

College hockey
The 2010 Frozen Four was held on April 8 and 10 with Boston College defeating Wisconsin to win the championship. This has been the only time NCAA hockey has used a football stadium for the championship (inspired in part by their college basketball counterparts) and resulted in the largest attendance (37,592) at a Frozen Four event.

High school competitions
Ford Field has hosted the MHSAA football state championships since 2005. It also hosted the MHSAA individual wrestling state finals in 2018.

The stadium also hosts the MCBA finals, where Michigan high school marching bands compete to be the best in the state.

Soccer
Ford Field hosted two group stage matches of the 2011 CONCACAF Gold Cup soccer tournament on June 7, 2011. Panama played Guadeloupe in the first match, while the United States played Canada in the second match.

In 2016, Dan Gilbert and Tom Gores announced a bid for a Major League Soccer expansion franchise, first looking at building a new open-air stadium in downtown Detroit, then focusing on playing at Ford Field, which would be retrofitted with a retractable roof. However, in 2018, Gilbert and Gores and the Ford family would "not move forward with this proposed retrofit, because the risks that would inhere to such an undertaking would substantially outweigh the rewards".

Other competitions
The Professional Bull Riders brought their Built Ford Tough Series tour to Ford Field for the first time ever on March 10, 2012. Ford Field is the second Detroit area venue the BFTS has visited; they had visited The Palace of Auburn Hills in 2001, 2006 and 2007.

The United States Hot Rod Association (USHRA) holds multiple Monster Jam Monster Truck races at Ford Field. These races were previously held in the Pontiac Silverdome until it was closed. AMA Supercross Championship, also a Feld Entertainment competition, has competed at Ford Field from 2006 to 2008 and 2014 to 2017.

Other events
On April 1, 2007, Ford Field hosted WWE's WrestleMania 23. This event set a Ford Field attendance record of 80,103. It was the first WrestleMania held in the Detroit area since 93,173 fans set a world indoor attendance record at the Pontiac Silverdome for WrestleMania III in 1987. WWE will return to the venue for SummerSlam on August 5, 2023.

Ford Field hosted the Society for Academic Emergency Medicine (SAEM) Midwest Regional in 2007 and 2014.

In 2015, Ford Field housed the large group gatherings of the ELCA Youth Gathering.

On November 18, 2017, Ford Field hosted the Beatification Mass of Fr. Solanus Casey, a Capuchin Franciscan Friar who ministered at the nearby St. Bonaventure Monastery on Mt. Elliott. The near-capacity crowd was one of the largest Catholic masses in Detroit history.

Ford Field hosted the FIRST Championship in 2018 and 2019 along with the nearby Cobo Center. The 2020 event was cancelled due to the COVID-19 pandemic.

Concerts

Photo gallery

References

Further reading

External links

 

Sports venues in Detroit
Downtown Detroit
Covered stadiums in the United States
American football venues in Michigan
Basketball venues in Michigan
College ice hockey venues in the United States
CONCACAF Gold Cup stadiums
Detroit Lions stadiums
Ford Motor Company
National Football League venues
NCAA bowl game venues
Rugby union stadiums in the United States
2002 establishments in Michigan
Sports venues completed in 2002
NCAA Division I men's basketball tournament Final Four venues